Hòa Phát Hà Nội was a Vietnamese football club based in Hanoi. It was merged with Hà Nội ACB into Hà Nội in September 2011.

Honours

National competitions
League
V.League 2:
 Runners-up :  2004, 2009
Cup
Vietnamese Cup:
 Winners :       2006

Performance in AFC competitions
AFC Cup: 1 appearance
2007: Group stage

External links
Official site

Association football clubs established in 2003
Association football clubs disestablished in 2011
Football clubs in Vietnam
Football clubs in Hanoi
2003 establishments in Vietnam
2011 disestablishments in Vietnam